Jason Dudley (born 10 November 1984) is an Australian former decathlete.

Dudley was based in Queensland and coached by Eric Brown.

In 2001, Dudley was a bronze medalist in the octathlon at the 2001 World Youth Championships in Hungary.

At the 2006 Commonwealth Games in Melbourne, Dudley scored 8001 points in the decathlon to finish in the bronze medal position. He had held the lead going into the final phase after setting a personal best to win the javelin event, but fell two places by only finishing fifth in the 1,500 metres race.

Dudley was national champion in the decathlon in 2006 and 2008.

References

External links
Jason Dudley at World Athletics

1984 births
Living people
Australian decathletes
Australian male athletes
Sportsmen from Queensland
Commonwealth Games bronze medallists for Australia
Commonwealth Games medallists in athletics
Athletes (track and field) at the 2006 Commonwealth Games
Medallists at the 2006 Commonwealth Games